Reschke is a German surname that may refer to

Anja Reschke (born 1972), German journalist
Klaus Reschke (born 1953), German sports shooter
Tom Reschke, American musician from Youngblood Brass Band
Willi Reschke (1922–2017), German Luftwaffe ace 

German-language surnames

de:Reschke